Karel van het Reve (19 May 1921 – 4 March 1999) was a Dutch writer, translator and literary historian, teaching and writing on Russian literature.

He was born in Amsterdam and was raised as a communist. He lost his 'faith' in his twenties and became an active critic and opponent of the Soviet regime. With his help, work of dissident Andrei Sakharov was smuggled to the west, and his Alexander Herzen Foundation published dissident Soviet literature.

He is considered to be one of the finest Dutch essayists, his interests ranging from the fallacies of Marxism to nude beach etiquette. His works include a history of Russian literature, 2 novels and several collections of essays. In 1978, Karel van het Reve delivered the Huizinga Lecture, under the title: Literatuurwetenschap: het raadsel der onleesbaarheid (Literary studies: the enigma of unreadability).

His brother, Gerard Reve, was a prominent prose writer.

The main-belt asteroid 12174 van het Reve, discovered by the Palomar–Leiden Survey in 1977, was named in his honor.

Bibliography

Novels
 ("Two minutes' silence", 1959)
 ("Night on the bare mountain", 1961)

References

External links 
 

1921 births
1999 deaths
Dutch essayists
Dutch literary critics
20th-century Dutch novelists
20th-century Dutch male writers
Dutch male novelists
Dutch translators
Dutch anti-communists
Netherlands–Russia relations
Writers from Amsterdam
P. C. Hooft Award winners
20th-century translators
Male essayists
20th-century essayists
Translators to Dutch
Translators from Russian